Ten Little Indians is a 1965 British crime mystery film directed by George Pollock. It is the second film version of Agatha Christie's 1939 novel. It was produced by Oliver A. Unger, with co-producer Harry Alan Towers also credited as co-writer under his pen name Peter Welbeck.

Although its background story is the same as the 1945 adaptation (And Then There Were None), with ten people invited to a remote location by a mysterious stranger, this one takes place on an isolated snowy mountain. This version is also the first adaptation of the novel to show the murders on screen. Actor Christopher Lee (uncredited) provided the pre-recorded gramophone voice of "Mr. U.N. Owen".

Plot
Ten people travel by aerial tramway to a snowbound mansion, invited there by a Mr. U.N. Owen (Unknown) to spend the weekend. They discover that none of them has actually ever met Owen, including his secretary as well as a married housekeeper and cook, all hired through an agency.

Framed copies of the children's nursery rhyme "Ten Little Indians" are hung on the walls of each guest's bedroom. Dinner is served by the butler Grohmann on a tray adorned with ten little Indian figurines, as well. At exactly 9 p.m., as instructed, Grohmann switches on a hidden tape recording. A man identifying himself as Owen reveals that each of the 10 guests has a scandalous secret, their involvement in various innocent people's deaths.

One by one, the guests begin dying off. Mike Raven chokes after taking a drink and dies, and a small Indian figurine from the centerpiece tray is broken away. In the morning, the tram cable is cut, killing the cook, Mrs. Grohmann, who attempted to escape. General Mandrake conducts a search of the chalet's catacombs, splitting everyone into pairs, ultimately leading to his demise, stabbed after being led to a planted distraction (a cat). It becomes clear that their unseen killer is following the nursery rhyme. Ann Clyde, the secretary, enters into a romantic relationship with engineer Hugh Lombard as they and the others begin a deadly cat-and-mouse game, ultimately deducing that Owen is not their host but, in reality, one of them.

After falling under suspicion from the others, Grohmann attempts to make his escape down the mountain peak, Devil's Leap, ending in his death after his lifeline is severed with an axe. Ilona bitterly confesses to having driven her husband to suicide, and is later found dead in her bedroom, killed with a syringe. By now, the five remaining guests fall under distrust of one another, and alliances are formed as the generator shuts down, casting the mansion into total darkness. At dinner, each person reveals the nature of their accusations, but before Ann can attest to her crime, she separates from the group to her room, where she screams upon discovering an Indian decoy hung from the ceiling. In the confusion, Judge Cannon is found with a gunshot wound to his head.

Dr. Armstrong intimates his suspicions of Ann, which Lombard angrily rebuffs. Lombard later comes to Ann's room and confides that his real name is Charles Morley, and that the real Lombard had committed suicide and he took his place for the weekend. Morley gives Ann his revolver for her protection. In the morning, Blore discovers that Armstrong has vanished and the three conduct a search for him. Blore separates and goes outside, where he is crushed by a large statue of a bear. Ann and Morley discover the body of Dr. Armstrong in the snow and conclude that the killer can only be either of them. Ann pulls the revolver on Morley and shoots at him, before returning to the mansion. She goes upstairs and discovers Judge Cannon very much alive, who explains how he persuaded Dr. Armstrong to help him fake his death. He adds that he intends to poison himself, leaving Ann as the last remaining survivor, who must hang herself and fulfill the rhyme, or be punished by the law instead.

As Judge Cannon is explaining his plan, having taken a fatal dose of poison, Morley reappears, alive. As he dies, Judge Cannon realizes his plan has failed, and Ann and Morley kiss in relief. They see the cat sitting with the fruit tray, with only two Indians attached.

Cast

Production
It was one of the first films Fabian made after his contract with Fox ended.

The house used in the film was Kenure House in Rush, County Dublin, Ireland. Most outdoor scenes were shot in the Zillertal in Tirol, Austria.

Reception and reputation
Referring to And Then There Were None (1945), Bosley Crowther wrote in The New York Times: "It would be foolish to say this remake comes within a country mile of that former movie version, which was directed by René Clair." Crowther added: "It does have sufficient of the essence of Miss Christie's strange and creepy tale ... to make it a gripping entertainment for youthful (and unfamiliar) mystery fans".

Variety magazine commented the film "works quite a bit of suspense into the restricted action, successfully hiding identity of the tenth Indian without resorting to too many 'red herrings'".

The reviewer for Time magazine wrote:
"Properly done, this old-fashioned brand of carnage can hardly miss. The remakers of Indians fail in every impossible way. By shifting the scene from a godforsaken island to an alpine retreat, they are able to engineer a couple of spectacular deaths among the crags, but the mood of boxed-in menace is effectively destroyed."

Stuart Galbraith IV, writing for DVD Talk in 2006, described this version as "no better than workmanlike but the story is so good that it overcomes the blandness of the adaptation". It is "devoid of visual flair, quite unlike the dreamlike sweep" of the earlier version.

DVD
Ten Little Indians was released to DVD by Warner Home Video on 14 March 2006 as a Region 1 widescreen DVD and also by Warner Archive as a MOD (manufacture-on-demand) DVD.

References

External links

 
 
 

1965 films
1960s mystery thriller films
British mystery thriller films
1960s English-language films
Films based on And Then There Were None
Films directed by George Pollock
Films scored by Malcolm Lockyer
Films set in country houses
Films shot in Austria
Films shot in the Republic of Ireland
Warner Bros. films
1960s British films